A foerster clamp is a surgical clamp with a round eyelet. Also known as a sponge clamp, or sponge stick. Used for atraumatically grasping lung tissue in thoracic surgery. When grasping a surgical sponge in the jaws, Foerster clamps are commonly used for removing small amounts of fluids from the operative area and applying pressure to sites of bleeding. May also be used for tissue dissection. Invented by David William Foerster of Oklahoma City, Oklahoma, who pioneered sex change operations in the United States.

Non-medical uses
It is commonly used in body piercing, particularly for tongue piercings.

See also
 Instruments used in general surgery
 Pennington clamp

Gallery

References

Medical clamps
Body piercing